Żukowo  is a town in Kartuzy County, in the Pomeranian Voivodeship of northern Poland in the cultural region of Kashubia, with 6,236 inhabitants (2005).

It is one of the youngest towns in Poland, having received its city charter in 1989, and a cultural centre of the Kashubs.

History

Żukowo was the site of a Premonstratensian (Norbertine) monastery established about 1209 by Duke Mestwin I of Pomerania. The church features alabaster figures made in England.
Here the Kashubian embroidery is still in use. In Kashubia decorated women's bonnets were called zlotnice. Norbertine nuns in Żukowo made them in the 18th century. The embroidery  was made with silver or gold threads. Women's bonnets designing contains motifs similar to church embroideries and this were based on baroque style. The nuns were teaching noblemen's and rich Kashubian peasants' daughters how to make embroidery – one of them was Marianna Okuniewska from Żukowo (born 1818). Żukowo was a church village administered by the local monastery, located in the Gdańsk County in the Pomeranian Voivodeship in the Crown of the Kingdom of Poland.

Zlotnice were very expensive. The nuns probably stopped making them after the region was annexed by the Kingdom of Prussia during the First Partition of Poland in 1772 and the nunnery was closed in 1834. Granddaughters of Marianna – Zofia (born 1896) and Jadwiga Ptach started reaktivating of Kashubian embroidery called Żukowo's school before World War II. Embroideries made here in this time link often to the zlotnice bonnets and antependiums. Kashubian embroidery was again made after the war at Żukowo. Its main decorative elements are flowers and plant motifs. Embroidresses who are deserved for the Kashubian embroidery, for example are: Marianna Ptach, Zofia Ptach, Jadwiga Ptach, Maria Nowicka, Wanda Dzierzgowska, Bernadeta Reglinska, Ewa Wendt and others. Zukowo school of Kashubian embroidery is important intangible cultural heritage. The town's coat of arms since 1989 feature among other things the palmette of Kashubian embroidery.

Until 1920, the town, as Zuckau belonged to the Karthaus district in the province of West Prussia in Germany. According to the census of 1910, it had a population of 1,379, of which 339 were Germans and 1,037 were Kashubians or Poles.

Żukowo was restored to Poland, after the country regained independence following World War I in 1918. During World War II it was under German occupation, and was a place of internment for prisoners of war from the United Kingdom. Local priest Bernard Gołomski was among 10 Polish priests murdered by the German Einsatzkommando 16 in the forest near Kartuzy in September 1939, and inhabitants of Żukowo were among Poles massacred in nearby Kaliska in October and November 1939. There are graves of prisoners of the Stutthof concentration camp in Żukowo. It was restored to Poland in 1945.

Sports
The town's most notable sports club is handball team GKS Żukowo, which competes in the I Liga (Polish second tier).

Notable people 
 Zuko Lynx (born 1945 in Żukowo) a Polish Roman Catholic bishop.

Literature 
 Wilhelm Brauer (ed.): Der Kreis Karthaus - Ein westpreußisches Heimatbuch, Radke, Lübeck 1978 (in German)
 Joshua C. Blank: Creating Kashubia: History, Memory, and Identity in Canada's First Polish Community, 2016, p. 47

References

External links

Kashubian embroidery
Żukowo
Zukowo school of Kashubian embroidery
Kashubian embroidery in Canada

Cities and towns in Pomeranian Voivodeship
Kartuzy County
Pomeranian Voivodeship (1919–1939)
Kashubian culture